Statistics of Japanese Regional Leagues for the 2007 season.

Champions list

League standings

Hokkaido

Tohoku

Kanto

Hokushinetsu

Tokai

Kansai

Chugoku

After 14 matches the league is split into two playoffs (top and bottom) of three games to decide the league champion and promotion candidates. This would normally also decide relegation candidates, though this did not happen this year due to league expansion. Owing to this, teams can have more points but still remain in a lower league position than others.

Shikoku

Kyushu

References

2007
4